Dhon Manma is a 1992 Maldivian drama film directed by Ahmed Sharmeel and Ibrahim Waheed. Produced for Star Light, the film stars Haajara Abdul Kareem, Ibrahim Shakir, Ahmed Sharmeel, Mariyam Haajara and Lillian Saeed in pivotal roles.

Plotline
The mother of two siblings (Mariyam Haajara and Lillian Saeed) passes away leaving the whole family shattered. Their father decides to marry a widow with three children, Jameela (Haajara Abdul Kareem), who has been living under financial strain caused by the dismissal of her husband. The film then portrays the hardship the step-mother endures while striving to create a bond with her step-children.

Cast 
 Haajara Abdul Kareem as Jameela
 Ibrahim Shakir as Solih
 Ahmed Sharmeel as Zaid
 Mariyam Haajara as Ashiya
 Lillian Saeed as Shalinee
 Fazeen Ahmed as Hishan
 Abdul Rahman Rauf as Zaid
 Ali Shameel as Shareef

Soundtrack

Accolades

References

Maldivian drama films
1992 films
1992 drama films
Dhivehi-language films